Downs Cone is one of several small cones or cone remnants along the southwest side of Toney Mountain in Marie Byrd Land, located 3 nautical miles (6 km) west-southwest of Boeger Peak. It was mapped by the United States Geological Survey from ground surveys and U.S. Navy air photos, 1959–66, and was named by the Advisory Committee on Antarctic Names for Bill S. Downs, a U.S. Navy Air Controlman at Williams Field near McMurdo Station in the 1969–70 and 1970–71 austral summers. He wintered at Little America V on the Ross Ice Shelf, 1958.

References 

Volcanoes of Marie Byrd Land